The Trinidad Sour is an IBA official cocktail. Unusually for a cocktail, it uses Angostura bitters as a base spirit rather than as a flavoring, the bitters being the single largest component of the drink in its IBA formulation.

See also
 List of cocktails

References

Cocktails with bitters
Cocktails with whisky